The Love Gambler is a 1922 American silent Western film directed by Joseph Franz and written by Jules Furthman. The film stars John Gilbert, Carmel Myers, Bruce Gordon, C.E. Anderson, W. E. Lawrence and James Gordon. The film was released on November 12, 1922, by Fox Film Corporation.

Plot summary

Cast        
 John Gilbert as Dick Manners
 Carmel Myers as Jean McClelland
 Bruce Gordon as Joe McClelland
 C.E. Anderson as Curt Evans
 W. E. Lawrence as Tom Gould
 James Gordon as Colonel Angus McClelland
 Mrs Cohen as Mrs McClelland
 Barbara Tennant as Kate
 Edward Cecil as Cameo Colby
 Doreen Turner as Ricardo

References

External links
 
 
 

1922 films
1922 Western (genre) films
Fox Film films
American black-and-white films
Films directed by Joseph Franz
Silent American Western (genre) films
1920s English-language films
1920s American films